Załuski may refer to the following places:
Załuski, Grójec County in Masovian Voivodeship (east-central Poland)
Załuski, Ostrołęka County in Masovian Voivodeship (east-central Poland)
Załuski, Podlaskie Voivodeship (north-east Poland)
Załuski, Płońsk County in Masovian Voivodeship (east-central Poland)
Załuski, Warmian-Masurian Voivodeship (north Poland)

See also
 Załuski (surname)